John Lange may refer to:

John Lange, a pen name of Michael Crichton
John E. Lange, US Ambassador
Johnny Lange, American songwriter, author and publisher
John Frederick Lange, Jr, American author of the Gor novel series under the pen name John Norman
Robert John "Mutt" Lange, South African record producer and songwriter
Johann Peter Lange, a German Calvinist theologian and Bible commentator

See also
John Lang (disambiguation)
John Laing (disambiguation)